Antonio Dorado Soto (June 18, 1931 – March 17, 2015) was a Spanish Roman Catholic bishop.

Ordained to the priesthood in 1956, Dorado Soto was named bishop of Guadix in 1970. He was then named bishop of Cádiz and Ceuta in 1973 and finally bishop of Málaga in 1993. He retired in 2008.

Notes

External links

1931 births
2015 deaths
Bishops of Cádiz y Ceuta
Bishops of Málaga